The  was established by Ogata No Saburo Koreyoshi in 1174 as a samurai clan of humble origins. The clan's history is recorded in several references and was a long-lasting clan that lived in Bungo, now called Oita Prefecture. The family's main recorded history dates to the Tale of Genji and "Okuninushi no Mikoto" which explains the legend and history of Ogata No Saburo Koreyoshi.

First English version
Helen McCullough translated the first English version of The Tale of the Heike which gives the first historical recording of Ogata No Saburo Koreyoshi, his command of the largest armies and importance that played a key role in the Minamoto's taking control of early Japan.  Dawson and De Benniville's works also explain the historical recordings of the first Ogata clan from Bungo.

First shōgun
The Ogata clan made a huge impact in the beginning of the first shōgun's rule. They helped established the Oka Castle, and help solidify the region with the large armies that Ogata No Saburo Koreyoshi commanded.

Late history
Japanese history books do not record the Ogata clan's quick rise and fall, as a clan that had made a huge impact, in a role that helped the Kamamura period to be established. Ogata clan descendants remained samurai until the last epic battles in the Meiji Restoration. The last recorded samurai of the Ogata clan was Ogata Shuntaro, who was MIA as the samurai fought to protect their heritage. Ogata Masanori of Tokyo, who was originally raised in Kumamoto Japan, traced the lineage of the Ogata clan back to the 1170s. His cousin, historian Sheldon T. Ogata, completed the research of the Ogata family in 2008-2010, tracing back to Ogata No Saburo Koreyoshi. The first Ogata clan was established in Bungo, Japan. Many of Ogata No Saburo Koreyoshi's descendants have the same Kanji and writings as his last name and can be found in Fukuoka and Kumamoto Japan. Many of his descendants now live in Hawaii, California, Brazil, and Georgia.

References
 Dawson, Richard Mercer (1973). Studies in Japanese Folklore. University of Michigan. p. 277. . 
 McCullough, Helen (1988). The Tale of the Heike. Stanford University Press. p. 263. . 
 McCullough, Helen (1966). Yoshitsune: A fifteenth-century Japanese chronicle. Stanford University Press. p. 154. . 
 de Benneville, James (2004). Tales of the Samurai. Dover Publications. p. 10 (footnote). .

Japanese clans
Samurai